Neno Nenov (born 14 June 1972) is a former Bulgarian footballer and manager.

Career
Nenov began his career with Chernomorets Burgas. He has also represented Slavia Sofia, Belasitsa, Spartak Varna, Balkan and Dunav Ruse.

Nenov has plied his trade almost exclusively in Bulgaria, having a short spell in neighbouring Greece. During his playing days with Balkan, he served as an assistant to manager Miroslav Mironov.

Between 2011 and 2013, he managed Master Burgas.

Nenov is married.

References

1972 births
Living people
Bulgarian footballers
Association football defenders
FC Chernomorets Burgas players
PFC Slavia Sofia players
PFC Belasitsa Petrich players
PFC Spartak Varna players
FC Dunav Ruse players
First Professional Football League (Bulgaria) players
Bulgarian expatriates in Greece
Expatriate footballers in Greece